William Wilson (18 October 1924 – 11 July 1969) was an Australian rules footballer who played in the VFL in between 1944 and 1954 for the Richmond Football Club.

After leaving Richmond he had three seasons with Glenelg in the SANFL, coming equal third for the Magarey Medal in 1955.

He then returned to Richmond and coached the Under 19 side from 1958 to 1960, leading them to the premiership in his first year.  He was a Richmond committeeman between 1966 and 1968, when he retired.  He died in Manila in July 1969.

References 

 Hogan P: The Tigers Of Old, Richmond FC, Melbourne 1996

External links
 
 

1924 births
1969 deaths
Richmond Football Club players
Glenelg Football Club players
Jack Dyer Medal winners
Australian rules footballers from Victoria (Australia)